The culture of Nigeria is shaped by Nigeria's multiple ethnic groups. The country has 527 languages, seven of which are extinct. Nigeria also has over 1150 dialects and ethnic groups. The three largest ethnic groups are the Hausas that are predominantly in the north, the Yorubas who predominate in the southwest, and the Igbos in the southeast. There are many other ethnic groups with sizeable populations across the different parts of the country. The Kanuri people are located in the northeast part of Nigeria, the Tiv people of north central and the Efik-Ibibio are in the south south. 
The Bini people are most frequent in the region between Yorubaland and Igboland.

Nigeria's other ethnic groups, sometimes called 'minorities', are found throughout the country but especially in the north and the middle belt. The traditionally nomadic Fulani can be found all over West and Central Africa. The Fulani and the Hausa are mostly Muslim, while the Igbo are mostly Christian and so are the Bini and the Ibibio. The Yoruba are predominantly of mixed Muslim and Christian backgrounds. The Yoruba make up about 21% of the country's population – estimated to be over 225 million – and about half of the Yoruba are Muslim, with the other half being Christian. Indigenous religious practices remain important to all of Nigeria's ethnic groups however, and frequently these beliefs are blended with Christian or Muslim beliefs, a practice known as syncretism.

History

Major ethnic cultures

Bini culture
 
The Binis, also called the Edo people, are people of the South South region of modern Nigeria; they are said to be around 3.8 million as of the 21st Century. They are ruled by monarchs, and are famous for their Benin Bronzes. In the pre-colonial period, they controlled a powerful empire. They are an ethnic group that is primarily found in Edo State, and spread across the Delta, Ondo, and Rivers states of Nigeria in smaller concentrations. The language they speak is called the Edo language. The Bini people are closely related to several other ethnic groups that usually speak Edoid languages, for example the Esan, however it is important to address the fact that the name "Benin" (and "Bini") is a Portuguese corruption, which came from the word "Ubinu", which came into use during the reign of Oba Ewuare the Great, c. 1440. The word "Ubinu" was used to depict and portray the royal administrative centre or capital proper of the kingdom, Edo. The word "Ubinu" was later corrupted to Bini by a number of mixed ethnicities staying together at the centre, and it was then further corrupted to Benin around the year 1485 at the time when the Portuguese people started making trade relations with Oba Ewuare.

Hausa-Fulani culture
 
The Hausa and Fulani ethnic groups are said to be one of the largest ethnic groupings in Nigeria, if not the largest, with a population of over 20 million people. The Hausa and Fulani live in the northern part of Nigeria. The Hausa and Fulani are in fact different tribes, but are often counted as one due to cultural similarity. The bulk of the Hausa-Fulani population is mainly centered in and around the centres of Sokoto, Kano and Katsina, which are said to be important market centres on the southern area of the trans-Saharan caravan trade routes.

Long before the arrival of the Fulani people, the Hausa had already formed and made well-organised city states; some of these states include Katsina, Daura, Kano Zazzau (Zaria), Biram, Gobir and Borno. However some of these states were conquered, taken over and re-established by the Fulani people which then led to the formation of a few other kingdoms such as Katagum, Hadejia and Gombe. The arrival of the Fulani people into Hausaland brought about great changes in the land, which included the introduction of Islam. This then ended up playing a significant role in the social life and culture of the Hausa people. In outlook, education, dress and taste, the Hausa people and their counterparts the Fulani have become a significant part of the Islamic world, this said influence still remains until the current day. The Fulani practice the art of whipping a suitor before giving his bride to him as parts of their marriage obligation, this particular obligation has helped to increase the practice of monogamy among themselves and it is called sharo. The Fulani people are also nomadic in nature; this nomadic lifestyle spread them into virtually all of West Africa. They are extremely tolerant of the languages of other people around them, leading to the suppression of theirs - especially in northern Nigeria by Hausa.

The Hausas, on the other hand, are said to be very good merchants. This helped spread them to some countries around Nigeria. They have monarchs, are known for celebrating the Hawan Sallah festival, and are also followers of the religious teachings of Sheikh Usman dan Fodio.

Igbo culture
 
The Igbo people, commonly and often referred to as Ibo people, are one of the largest ethnic groups to ever exist in Africa; they have a total population of about 20 million people. Most people who are a part of this ethnic group are based in the southeastern part of Nigeria, they contribute to about 17 percent of the country's population. They can also be found in large numbers in Cameroon and other African countries. It is believed that the Igbo people originated in an area that is about 100 miles north of their current location at the confluence of the Niger and Benue Rivers. The Igbo people share linguistic ties with their neighbours the Bini, Igala, Yoruba, and Idoma, with whom it is believed they were closely related until five to six thousand years ago. The first Igbo in the region may have moved onto the Awka-Orlu plateau between four and five thousand years ago. The eastern part of Nigeria is the home of the Igbos, who are mostly Christians. Their traditional religion is known as Omenani/Omenala. Both concepts, each an aspect of a single whole, aspire to protect and preserve the purity, sanctity and sacredness of the land and the people therein. 'Omenana' is man-made; it is easily changed and is adaptable. 'Odinana', on the contrary, is a code of life, handed down from Chukwu, God the Creator, to Eri, the patriarch of the Igbo race, to prevent chaos and confusion. The earth spirit, Ana, is 'odinana', as is the sacred role of yam in the Igbo world, the right of inheritance, and the place of the elder. 'Odinana', as the immutable customary rites and traditions of the Igbo world, is enduring and cuts across indigenous Igbo people, while 'omenana' is rather relative from one section of the Igbo to the other. Socially, the Igbos are led by monarchs who had limited power historically. These figures are expected to confer subordinate titles upon men and women that are highly accomplished. This is known as the Nze na Ozo title system.

Ijaw culture
 
The Ijaw people are said to be a collection of people that are native to the Niger Delta area in Nigeria. Owing to the affinity they have with water, a significant number of the Ijaw people are discovered as migrant fishermen in camps that are as far west as Sierra Leone and as far east as Gabon. With a population of over ten million, the Ijaws are arguably the most populous tribe inhabiting the Niger Delta section and arguably the fourth largest ethnic group in Nigeria occupying about 10% of Nigeria's population. From a historical perspective, it is almost impossible to give a precise and accurate account as to when and where the Ijaws originated, numerous different accounts have been given by many historians regarding this issue but what is certain is that the Ijaws are one of the world's most ancient peoples. The Ijaw people are said by some to be the descendants of the autochthonous people of Africa known as the (H) ORU.  The Ijaws were originally known by this name (Oru); at least it was what their immediate neighbours assumed them to be. Although this was a very long time ago, the Ijaws have, however, kept the ancient language and culture of the Orus. Being the first to find a settlement in the Lower Niger and Niger Delta, it is possible that they may have started inhabiting this region as far back as 500 BC.

Language and cultural studies suggest that they are related to the founders of the Great Nile Valley civilization complex (and possibly the lake Chad complex). They immigrated to West Africa from the Nile Valley during antiquity. The Ijaw culture of the South has been influenced greatly by its location on the coast and the interaction with foreigners that it necessitated. Its members amassed great wealth while serving as middlemen, and the preponderance of English names among them today is a testament to the trade names adopted by their ancestors at this time.

Yoruba culture
 
The Yoruba people are said to be one of the three largest ethnic groups in Nigeria, alongside the Igbo and the Hausa-Fulani peoples. They are concentrated in the southwestern section of Nigeria, much smaller and scattered groups of Yoruba people live in Benin and northern Togo and they are numbered to be more than 20 million at the turn of the 21st century. The Yoruba people have always shared a common language called the Yoruba language and the same culture for hundreds of years now but they were less likely to be a single political unit. The Yoruba people are believed to have migrated from the east to their present lands west of the lower Niger River more than a millennium ago. They eventually became the most urbanized Africans of precolonial times. The Yoruba people eventually formed many kingdoms of various different sizes, each of which was centered on a capital city or town and that was being ruled by a hereditary king known as an oba. Their towns eventually became more and more populated and grew into the present-day cities of Oyo, Ile-Ife, Ilesha, Ibadan, Ilorin, Ijebu-Ode, Ikere-Ekiti, and others. Oyo developed in the medieval and early modern periods into the largest of the Yoruba kingdoms, while Ile-Ife still remained a town of very strong religious significance as the site of the earth's creation according to Yoruba mythology. Oyo and the other kingdoms declined in the late 18th and 19th centuries owing to disputes among minor Yoruba rulers and invasions by the Fon of Dahomey (now Benin) and the Muslim Fulani. The traditional Yoruba kingships still survive, but with only a hint of their former political power. Their chiefs are therefore monarchs and titled individuals, with most of the latter group making up the membership of the Ogboni secret society. Their traditional religion, Ifa, has been recognized by UNESCO as a masterpiece of the oral tradition of Humanity.

Nigerian upper class
 

Ever since the country's earliest centralization - under the Nokites at a time contemporaneous to the birth of Jesus Christ - Nigeria has been ruled by a class of titled potentates that are known as chiefs. Led by the Nigerian traditional rulers (i.e. monarchs who have received definite authority from the official government and are recognized by the laws of Nigeria), the chiefs come in various ranks and are of varied kinds - some monarchs are so powerful that they influence political and religious life outside their immediate domains (the Sultan of Sokoto and the Ooni of Ife, for example), while in contrast many local families around the country install their eldest members as titled chiefs in order for them to provide them with what is an essentially titular leadership.

Although chiefs have few official powers today, they are widely respected, and prominent monarchs are often courted to endorse politicians during elections in the hopes of them conferring legitimacy to their campaigns by way of doing so. Successful Nigerians, such as businessmen and the said politicians, typically themselves aspire to the holding of chieftaincies, and the monarchs' control of the honours system that provides them to them serves as an important royal asset.

Literature

 
 
Nigeria is famous for its English language literature. Things Fall Apart, by Chinua Achebe, is an important book in African literature. With over eight million copies sold worldwide, it has been translated into 50 languages, making Achebe the most translated African writer of all time.

Nigerian Nobel laureate Wole Soyinka described the work as "the first novel in English which spoke from the interior of the African character, rather than portraying the African as an exotic, as the white man would see him." Nigeria has other notable writers of English language literature. These include Femi Osofisan, whose first published novel, Kolera Kolej, was produced in 1975; Ben Okri, whose first work, The Famished Road, was published in 1991, and Buchi Emecheta, who wrote stories drawn from her personal experiences of gender inequity that promote viewing women through a single prism of the ability to marry and have children. Helon Habila, Sefi Atta , Flora Nwapa, Iquo DianaAbasi Eke, Zaynab Alkali and Chimamanda Ngozi Adichie, among others, are notable Nigerian authors whose works are read widely within and outside the country.

Apart from the speakers of standard English, a large portion of the population, roughly a third, speaks Nigerian pidgin, which has a primarily English lexicon. It has become a common lingua franca as a result. Pidgin English is a creolized form of the language. For instance, "How you dey" means "How are you". The Palm Wine Drinkard, a popular novel by Amos Tutuola, was written in it.

Film

Since the 1990s the Nigerian movie industry, sometimes called "Nollywood", has emerged as a fast-growing cultural force all over Africa. Vast wealth has been generated by it, and it is currently the second-largest film industry in the world by output.

Because of the movies, western influences such as music, casual dressing and methods of speaking are to be found all across Nigeria, even in the highly conservative north of the country.

Media

Sports

The Nigerian national football team, nicknamed the "Super Eagles", is the national team of Nigeria, run by the Nigeria Football Federation (NFF). According to the FIFA World Rankings, Nigeria ranks 31st and holds the second-highest place among the African nations behind Senegal (20th). The highest position Nigeria ever reached on the ranking was 5th, in April 1994.

Supporters of English football clubs like Manchester United, Arsenal, Manchester City, Liverpool and Chelsea often segregate beyond the traditional tribal and even religious divide to share their common cause in Premier League teams.

Architecture

Food

Nigerian food offers a rich blend of traditionally African carbohydrates such as yam and cassava as well as the vegetable soups with which they are often served. Maize is another crop that is commonly grown in Nigeria. Praised by Nigerians for the strength it gives, garri is "the number one staple carbohydrate food item in Nigeria",
a powdered cassava grain that can be readily eaten as a meal and is quite inexpensive. Yams are frequently eaten either fried in oil or pounded to make a mashed potato-like yam pottage. Nigerian beans, quite different from green peas, are widely popular. Meat is also popular and Nigerian suya—a barbecue-like roasted meat—is a well-known delicacy. Bushmeat, meat from wild game like antelope and duikers, is also popular. Fermented palm products make a traditional liquor, palm wine, and also fermented cassava. Nigerian foods are spicy, mostly in the western and southern part of the country, even more so than in Indian cuisine. Some more examples of their traditional dishes are eba, pounded yam, iyan, fufu and soups like okra, ogbono and egusi. Fufu is so emblematic of Nigeria that it figures in Chinua Achebe's Things Fall Apart, for example.

Nigeria is known for its many traditional dishes. Each tribe has different dishes that are unique to their culture. Yoruba people, for example, have different dishes like Amala, Ogbono, Moin Moin, Ofada Rice, and Efo Riro.

Music

The music of Nigeria includes many kinds of folk and popular music, some of which are known worldwide. The singer and social activist Fela Kuti was instrumental in Nigeria's musical development. His personalized sound, dubbed Afrobeat, is now one of the continent's most widely recognised genres.

Traditional musicians use a number of diverse instruments, such as Gongon drums. The kora and the kakaki are also important.

Other traditional cultural expressions are found in the various masquerades of Nigeria, such as the Eyo masquerades of Lagos, the Ekpe and Ekpo masquerades of the Efik/Ibibio/Annang/Igbo peoples of coastal southeastern Nigeria, and the Northern masquerades of the Bini. The most popular Yoruba manifestations of this custom are the Gelede masquerades.

Clothing

Women wear long flowing robes and headscarves made by local makers who dye and weave the fabric locally. Southern Nigerian women choose to wear western-style clothing. People in urban regions of Nigeria dress in western style, the youth mainly wearing jeans and T-shirts.  Other Nigerian men and women typically wear a traditional style called Buba. For men the loose-fitting shirt goes down to halfway down the thigh. For women, the loose-fitting blouse goes down a little below the waist. Other clothing gear includes a gele, which is the woman's headgear. For men their traditional cap is called fila.

Historically, Nigerian fashion incorporated many different types of fabrics. Cotton has been used for over 500 years for fabric-making in Nigeria. Silk (called tsamiya in Hausa, sanyan in Yoruba, and akpa-obubu in Igbo) is also used. Perhaps the most popular fabric used in Nigerian fashion is Dutch wax print, produced in the Netherlands. The import market for this fabric is dominated by the Dutch company Vlisco, which has been selling its Dutch wax print fabric to Nigerians since the late 1800s, when the fabric was sold along the company's oceanic trading route to Indonesia. Since then, Nigerian and African patterns, colour schemes, and motifs have been incorporated into Vlisco's designs to become a staple of the brand.

Nigeria has over 250 ethnic groups and as a result, a wide variety of traditional clothing styles. In the Yoruba tradition, women wear an iro (wrapper), buba (loose shirt) and gele (head-wrap). The men wear buba (long shirt), sokoto (baggy trousers), agbada (flowing robe with wide sleeves) and fila (a hat). In the Igbo tradition, the men's cultural attire is Isiagu (a patterned shirt), which is worn with trousers and the traditional Igbo men's hat called Okpu Agwu. The women wear a puffed sleeved blouse, two wrappers and a headwrap. Hausa men wear barbarigas or kaftans (long flowing gowns) with tall decorated hats. The women wear wrappers and shirts and cover their heads with hijabs (veils).

Resources

A very important source of information on modern Nigerian art is the Virtual Museum of Modern Nigerian Art operated by the Pan-Atlantic University in Lagos.

In addition, the Nigerian Investment Promotion Commission, and Naija Invest Gateway, provide real-time information on the Nigerian business culture.

See also

 Architecture of Nigeria
 Music of Nigeria
 Nok culture
 Festivals in Nigeria
 List of museums in Nigeria

References

 Ross, Will. "Nigeria's thriving art and music scene." (Archive) BBC. 20 November 2013.